This is a list of people executed in Illinois.  A total of twelve people convicted of murder have been executed by the state of Illinois since 1977. All were executed by lethal injection. Another man condemned in Illinois, Alton Coleman, was executed in Ohio.

Capital punishment in Illinois was abolished in 2011.

List of people executed in Illinois

Abolition of death penalty 
Governor Pat Quinn signed legislation on March 9, 2011, to abolish the death penalty in Illinois. All fifteen death row inmates in the state had their sentences commuted to life imprisonment without parole.

See also 
 Capital punishment in Illinois
 Capital punishment in the United States

Notes

References 

Executions
Illinois